Padayappa is the soundtrack album of the 1999 Indian Tamil drama film of the same name written and directed by K. S. Ravikumar. The film's original soundtrack and score were composed by A. R. Rahman, with lyrics written by Vairamuthu and was released through the audio label Star Music. The soundtrack of the Telugu dubbed version titled Narasimha was released through Saregama.

Development 
Before the film's release, Rahman had asked Ravikumar whether the soundtrack could be released in August 1999. Ravikumar informed Rahman that he had spoken to the press about the completion of the film's making, and that Rahman would be blamed if the film had a delayed release. As a result, Rahman did a live re-recording of both the soundtrack and score to finish them on time.

The credits for the song "Vetri Kodi Kattu", which was sung by Palakkad Sreeram, initially went to Malaysia Vasudevan, who publicly stated that the credits for the song were attributed to Sreeram and not to him. Rahman requested the company who manufactured the audio cassettes to make the change. "Minsara Poove" had two versions with Hariharan rendering his vocals while the version of Srinivas was initially recorded as "track version". Rajini and Ravikumar preferred Srinivas's version "as it was more majestic". The song "Minsara Kanna" is based on the Vasantha raga, while "Vetri Kodi Kattu" is based on the Keeravani raga.

Reception 
Singer Charulatha Mani, in her column for The Hindu, "A Raga's journey", called "Minsara Kanna" "a mind-blowing piece" G. Dhananjayan, in his book Best of Tamil Cinema, says the songs are "mass entertaining", also citing that the songs contributed to the film's success. Srikanth Srinivasa of the Deccan Herald wrote, "The music by Rahman, to Vairamuthu’s lyrics, sounds good while the movie is on, though whether without the presence of Rajanikanth they would have, is another thing.[sic]" S. Shiva Kumar of The Times of India was more critical of the soundtrack, and called it "lacklustre".

Track list

Tamil

Telugu

Album credits 
 Harmony : Ganga, Kanchana, Febi, Feji, Chandran, Srinivas, Noell
 Hindustani Aalaap : Hariharan
 Additional programming : H. Sridhar
 Orchestra conducted by : Srinivasamoorthy
 Mridangam : D. A. Srinivas
 Nadaswaram : Vasu
 Clarinet : M. S. V. Raja
 Flute : Naveen
 Guitar : Kabuli, Rupert
 Ghatam : T. H. V. Umashankar
 Trumpets : Eugene, Roy, Thomas, Babu
 Darbuka percussion : Jaikumar

References

Bibliography

External links 

1999 soundtrack albums
A. R. Rahman soundtracks
Tamil film soundtracks